The Thomas Jefferson Center for the Protection of Free Expression is a nonprofit, nonpartisan institution devoted solely to the defense of the First Amendment rights guaranteeing freedom of speech and of the press. The center was founded in 1989, under the direction of former University of Virginia president Robert M. O'Neil. J. Joshua Wheeler succeeded O'Neil as Director of the Center in 2011. The Center manages a number of programs and activities to fulfill its mission, including the drafting of amicus curiae briefs in support of First Amendment litigants, congressional testimony, educational programs, artistic exhibitions and prizes, and the Jefferson Muzzles awards.  The center is located at Pantops Farm, a property in Charlottesville, Virginia that was once owned personally by Jefferson, and is now owned by the University of Virginia.

The center has close ties to the University of Virginia, but it is not officially affiliated. It was founded with initial contributions from The New York Times and Worrell Enterprises Inc. In addition to its Muzzle Awards, it sponsors the William J. Brennan, Jr., Award, which recognizes those persons showing extraordinary devotion to the principles of free speech. It honors the former Associate Justice of the Supreme Court.

External links
 Official website

References

University of Virginia
Non-profit organizations based in Charlottesville, Virginia
Freedom of expression organizations
1989 establishments in Virginia
Thomas Jefferson
Freedom of speech in the United States